Kiara Bowers (born 16 November 1991) is an Australian rules footballer playing for the Fremantle Football Club in the AFL Women's (AFLW). 

Bowers is regarded as the greatest women's footballer Western Australia has produced and one of the best current athletes in the state.

Early Life
Kiara was raised in Perth, Western Australia as one of nine siblings. Bowers played rugby, softball, athletics and basketball prior to taking up Australian rules. Though she didn't play Australian rules she grew up supporting the Melbourne Football Club. Inspired by her older brother Andrew's efforts in the WAFL with South Fremantle and Swan Districts, Kiara took up Australian rules while at high school with the Coastal Titans. She went on to be a standout performer, winning the league best and fairest 4 times and representing Western Australia 5 times. 

Bowers signed with Melbourne Football Club in 2013 and was part of the team that played in exhibition series matches in 2013, 2014, 2015 prior to the commencement of the AFLW.

Career
In July 2016, Bowers was announced as Fremantle's second marquee signing ahead of the inaugural AFL Women's season. However, in August 2016, 5 months before the start of the season, Bowers ruptured her anterior cruciate ligament whilst playing for the Coastal Titans in the West Australian Women's Football League. She would not play for Fremantle at all in the first two seasons of the AFLW.

She made her debut in the four point win against  at Casey Fields in the opening round of the 2019 season.

She had an outstanding debut season, finishing second behind Erin Phillips in the league's player voted Most valuable player award, sixth in the AFL Women's best and fairest award, winning Fremantle's best and fairest award and being named in the 2019 AFL Women's All-Australian team. In 2020 she played in every game of Fremantle's undefeated season, winning the best player award in the first ever AFL Women's Western Derby and was again named in the All-Australian team.

Bowers continued her exceptional form into 2021, sharing the AFL Women's best and fairest award with Collingwood's Brianna Davey, being selected in her third consecutive All-Australian team, as vice-captain, and claiming the AFLW Champion Player of the Year Award. Bowers achieved selection in Champion Data's 2021 AFLW All-Star stats team, after leading the league for pressure points in the 2021 AFL Women's season, leading the league for pressure acts, pressure points, tackles and forced turnovers.

Personal life
Bowers is a carpenter who lives with her partner Adele and their son Nate.

Statistics
Statistics are correct to the end of the 2021 season.

|- style=background:#EAEAEA
| scope="row" text-align:center | 2017
|
| 2 || 0 || – || – || – || – || – || – || – || – || – || – || – || – || – || – || 0
|-
| scope="row" text-align:center | 2018
|
| 2 || 0 || – || – || – || – || – || – || – || – || – || – || – || – || – || – || 0
|- style=background:#EAEAEA
| scope=row | 2019 ||  || 2
| 8 || 3 || 3 || 116 || 21 || 137 || 25 || bgcolor=FA8072 | 89§  || 0.4 || 0.4 || 14.5 || 2.6 || 17.1 || 3.1 || bgcolor=FA8072 | 11.1§ || 7
|-
| scope=row | 2020 ||  || 2
| 7 || 1 || 1 || 98 || 25 || 123 || 18 || bgcolor=FA8072 | 99§  || 0.1 || 0.1 || 14.0 || 3.6 || 17.6 || 2.6 || bgcolor=FA8072 | 14.1§ || 12
|- style=background:#EAEAEA
| scope=row | 2021 ||  || 2
| 10 || 2 || 4 || 158 || 53 || 211 || 25 || bgcolor=FA8072 | 110§  || 0.2 || 0.4 || 15.8 || 5.3 || 21.1 || 2.5 || bgcolor=FA8072 | 11.0§ || bgcolor=98FB98 | 15±
|- class=sortbottom
! colspan=3 | Career
! 25 !! 6 !! 8 !! 372 !! 99 !! 471 !! 68 !! 298 !! 0.2 !! 0.3 !! 14.9 !! 4.0 !! 18.8 !! 2.7 !! 11.9 !! 34
|}

References

External links 

1991 births
Living people
Fremantle Football Club (AFLW) players
Australian rules footballers from Western Australia
Lesbian sportswomen
Australian LGBT sportspeople
LGBT players of Australian rules football